Sidney Wayne Akins (born November 14, 1962) is an American retired professional baseball pitcher.

Career
Akins attended Cleveland High School in Los Angeles and the University of Southern California (USC), where he played college baseball for the Trojans. He played for the United States national baseball team in the 1984 Summer Olympics.

The Texas Rangers selected Akins in the third round of the 1984 MLB Draft. The Rangers released him during spring training in 1986, and he signed with the Atlanta Braves' organization. The Braves added him to their 40-man roster after the 1987 season.

Personal life
Akins is a cousin of pitcher Randy Wolf and umpire Jim Wolf.

References

External links

Living people
1962 births
Baseball players from Los Angeles
Baseball pitchers
Burlington Rangers players
Sumter Braves players
Pulaski Braves players
Greenville Braves players
Durham Bulls players
Richmond Braves players
Arkansas Travelers players
Baseball players at the 1984 Summer Olympics
Medalists at the 1984 Summer Olympics
Olympic silver medalists for the United States in baseball